The Engineering Development Trust is a UK not for shareholder profit organization, which administers a number of schemes designed to encourage school pupils to have an interest and involvement in science and engineering

History
The EDT was established in 1984.

In September 2017, long standing CEO Gordon Mizner retired from his position to be replaced by Julie Feest.

Structure
It has a main office situated near Ridgeway Academy in the east of Welwyn Garden City, not far from the B195. Other regional office locations include Southampton, Plymouth and Glasgow.

Operation
It runs the Go4Set residential courses to link school pupils with companies in the STEM or SET (Science, Engineering and Technology) field. It claims to be the largest provider of STEM enrichment activities for young people in the UK. All of the Engineering Development Trust's schemes are part of the Royal Academy of Engineering's BEST programme.

See also
 Engineering Education Scheme
 Year in Industry
 Royal Academy of Engineering

References

External links
 Engineering Development Trust website
 Engineering Education Scheme (England) website
 Headstart website
 Year in Industry website
 Royal Academy of Engineering's BEST Programme website
 An overview of the Engineering Development Trust's programmes, Ingenia Magazine, September 2007
 Weltech Business Centre

1984 establishments in the United Kingdom
Engineering education in the United Kingdom
Engineering societies based in the United Kingdom
Non-profit organisations based in the United Kingdom
Organisations based in Hertfordshire
Organizations established in 1984
Science and technology in the United Kingdom
Welwyn Hatfield
Youth science